The World Series of Poker (WSOP), held annually in Las Vegas, is "the oldest, largest, most prestigious, and most media-hyped gaming competition in the world".  The WSOP bracelet is considered the most coveted non-monetary prize a poker player can win. Since 1976, a bracelet has been awarded to the winner of every event at the annual WSOP, but titles won before 1976 are still counted as "bracelets".

The first WSOP was not a freeze out tournament, but rather an event with a set start and stop time and the winner determined by secret ballot.  In 1973, a second event, five-card stud, was added.  Over the years, most of the major poker variants have been played at least once.   In 1977, the first Ladies only event was introduced in the form of $100 buy-in Stud Poker Tournament.  Jackie McDaniels won that event to become the first Ladies Champion.  She won one of the smallest prizes ($5,580) in WSOP history.  By 2007, the popularity of the Ladies Event had grown to the point that it became the first Ladies-only event to have a prize pool greater than $1,000,000.  The Ladies played Seven Card Stud for the event's first two decades, but have been playing Texas hold 'em since 2001.

Since its inception, three players have won multiple Ladies Championships:  Barbara Enright, Susie Isaacs, and Nani Dollison.  Dollison  and Isaacs won the event in consecutive years.  Between 1991 and 1997, Isaacs set an event record by qualifying for a cash prize, known as finishing in-the-money, five times.  The 1983 Ladies World Poker Championship was the first time that a person "of color", Carolyn Gardner, won a WSOP bracelet.

Traditionally, the Ladies event was the only event held on Mother Day.  Due to complaints from mothers, the event was moved to a different day in 2004.  Potential conflicts with Mother's Day no longer exist as the WSOP's new owner, Harrah's Casino, moved the event from late spring to the late summer.

The WSOP started offering a "WSOP Academy Ladies Only Poker Camp" in 2007.  This week-long event is held at Caesars Palace and is designed to equip women with the tools to compete at the World Series of Poker.  It is held the week leading up to the Ladies Championship.  Every year since its inception, a participant from the camp has made it to the final table.  In 2007, Ladies Champion Sally Anne Boyer participated in the camp. Patty Till, a 2008 attendee, finished in third place at the 2008 Ladies Championship.

WSOP Ladies Championship events

2005 Ladies Champion Jennifer Tilly was the first non-poker celebrity to win a WSOP bracelet.  Tilly had been nominated for an Academy Award for her role in Bullets over Broadway.

On 10 June 2008, three events awarded bracelets, including the Ladies event.  This was the first time in WSOP history that three people living in the same city, New York, won bracelets on the same day.  It was also the first time that a new "excessive celebration" penalty was implemented to minimize disruption from exuberant players.

From 2013, the entry fee was officially changed to $10,000 with a $9,000 "discount" for ladies.  This was done to close a legal loophole used by men to enter the ladies event in several prior years.

References

 Ladies